Erik Eloe Andersen (15 August 1902 – 2 January 1980) was a Danish cyclist. He competed in the individual time trial event at the 1924 Summer Olympics.

References

External links
 

1902 births
1980 deaths
Danish male cyclists
Olympic cyclists of Denmark
Cyclists at the 1924 Summer Olympics
People from Næstved
Sportspeople from Region Zealand